Tibor "Ted" Rubin (June 18, 1929 – December 5, 2015) was a Hungarian-American Army Corporal. A Holocaust survivor who immigrated to the U.S. in 1948, he fought in the Korean War and was awarded the Medal of Honor for his actions during the war, as a combatant and a prisoner of war (POW).

Rubin received the award from President George W. Bush on September 23, 2005, 55 years after the Korean war. Rubin was repeatedly nominated for various military decorations, but was overlooked because of antisemitism by a superior. Fellow soldiers who filed affidavits supporting Rubin's nomination for the Medal of Honor said that Rubin's sergeant "was an anti-Semite who gave Rubin dangerous assignments in hopes of getting him killed". In November, 2016, President Obama signed legislation renaming the Long Beach California VA Medical Center after Rubin.

Early life
Rubin was born on June 18, 1929, in Pásztó, a Hungarian town with a Jewish population of 120 families, one of six children (by three marriages) of shoemaker Ferenc Rubin.

When Tibor was 13, Ferenc and Rosa Rubin (Tibor's stepmother) tried to send him to safety in neutral Switzerland, but he was caught and sent to the Mauthausen concentration camp in Austria. He was liberated by American combat troops when they arrived at Mauthausen on May 5, 1945. Both of his parents and a sister perished in the Holocaust.

Emigration to the United States
Rubin entered the United States in 1948, settled in New York and worked first as a shoemaker. He then apprenticed as a butcher at Michael Bela Wilhelm's Hungarian butcher shop on Third Avenue in the Yorkville neighborhood for about a year.

In 1949, he tried to enlist in the U.S. Army. He failed the English language test, but tried again in 1950 and passed with some judicious help from two fellow test-takers.

Antisemitism in the army
By July 1950, Private First Class Rubin found himself fighting in South Korea with I Company, 8th Cavalry Regiment, First Cavalry Division. According to lengthy affidavits submitted by nearly a dozen men who served with Rubin in South and North Korea, mostly self-described "country boys" from the South and Midwest, an antisemitic sergeant named Arthur Peyton consistently "volunteered" Rubin for the most dangerous patrols and missions.

During one mission, according to the testimonies of his comrades, Rubin secured a needed route of retreat for his rifle company by single-handedly defending a hill for 24 hours against waves of North Korean soldiers. For this and other acts of bravery, Rubin was recommended four times for the Medal of Honor by two of his commanding officers. Both officers were killed in action shortly afterwards, but not before ordering Rubin's sergeant to begin the necessary paperwork recommending Rubin for the Medal of Honor. Some of Rubin's comrades were present and witnessed the order being issued, and all are convinced that Peyton deliberately ignored his orders. "I really believe, in my heart, that [the sergeant] would have jeopardized his own safety rather than assist in any way whatsoever in the awarding of the Medal of Honor to a person of Jewish descent", wrote Corporal Harold Speakman in a notarized affidavit.

Chinese POW camp
Towards the end of October 1950, massive Chinese troop concentrations had crossed the border into North Korea and were attacking the unprepared American troops now trapped far inside North Korea. Most of Rubin's regiment had been killed or captured. Rubin, severely wounded, was captured and spent the next 30 months in a prisoner of war camp.

Faced with constant hunger, filth, and disease, most of the GIs simply gave up. "No one wanted to help anyone. Everybody was for himself", wrote Leo A. Cormier Jr., a former sergeant and POW. The exception was Rubin. Almost every evening, Rubin would sneak out of the prison camp to steal food from the Chinese and North Korean supply depots, knowing that he would be shot if caught. "He shared the food evenly among the GIs," Cormier wrote. "He also took care of us, nursed us, carried us to the latrine..., he did many good deeds, which he told us were mitzvahs in the Jewish tradition... he was a very religious Jew and helping his fellow men was the most important thing to him". The survivors of the prison war camp credited Rubin with keeping them alive and saving at least 40 American soldiers.

Rubin refused his captors' repeated offers of repatriation to Hungary, by then behind the Iron Curtain.

Awards and decorations

Medal of Honor
In 1993, a study was commissioned by the United States Army to investigate racial discrimination in the awarding of medals. In 2001, after considering the case of Leonard M. Kravitz, Congress directed the military to further review certain cases. The ensuing investigation showed that Rubin had been the subject of discrimination due to his religion and should have received the Medal of Honor.

In 2005, President George W. Bush presented the Medal of Honor to Rubin in a ceremony at the White House, for his actions in 1950 during the Korean War.

Citation

Later life and death
After his military service, he worked in his brother's Long Beach liquor store. Rubin was a resident of Garden Grove, California.

He regularly volunteered at the Long Beach Veterans Hospital; having earned an award for more than 20,000 hours of volunteer work. On May 10, 2017, the Medical Center was renamed in his honor as the "Tibor Rubin VA Medical Center".

Rubin died December 5, 2015, at his home in Garden Grove. He was survived by his wife Yvonne and their two children, Frank and Rosie.

Finnigan's War
Tibor Rubin is one of the Korean War heroes honored in the 2013 documentary Finnigan's War, directed by Conor Timmis.  Rubin recalls his Holocaust experience and Korean War POW experience.  Rubin's interview is intercut with footage of President George W. Bush telling Rubin's life story during his 2005 Medal of Honor ceremony.  Actor Mark Hamill narrates Rubin's Medal of Honor citation in the film.  Filmmaker Conor Timmis was greatly impressed by Rubin's positive attitude and sense of humor despite all the suffering he endured during his life.

See also

 List of Korean War Medal of Honor recipients
 List of Jewish Medal of Honor recipients
Single Handed (book) by Daniel M. Cohen

References

Further reading
 Cohen, Daniel M. (2015). Single Handed: The Inspiring True Story of Tibor "Teddy" Rubin, Holocaust Survivor, Korean War Hero, and Medal of Honor Recipient. New York: Berkley Caliber,

External links
 Jewish Vet Gets Medal of Honor 55 Years On Josh White, The Washington Post, September 24, 2005
 Tibor Rubin: An Unusual Hero of The Korean War

Videos 
 Video of Medal of Honor Presentation by George W. Bush, September 23, 2005, from C-SPAN
 List of Videos for Medal of Honor Recipient Corporal Tibor Rubin, U.S. Army website
 Tibor Rubin – Medal of Honor, Korean War, Artisan Books and the Congressional Medal of Honor Foundation

1929 births
2015 deaths
People from Pásztó
Hungarian Jews
Jewish American military personnel
United States Army personnel of the Korean War
United States Army Medal of Honor recipients
American prisoners of war in the Korean War
United States Army non-commissioned officers
American people of Hungarian-Jewish descent
Jewish Medal of Honor recipients
Hungarian emigrants to the United States
Foreign-born Medal of Honor recipients
Mauthausen concentration camp survivors
Korean War recipients of the Medal of Honor
Hungarian-born Medal of Honor recipients
Military personnel from California
21st-century American Jews